An accessibility relation is a relation which plays a key role in assigning truth values to sentences in the relational semantics for modal logic. The fact  is crucial.

Accessibility relations are motivated conceptually by the fact that natural language modal statements depend on some, but not all alternative scenarios. For instance, the sentence "It might be raining" is not generally judged true simply because one can imagine a scenario where it was raining. Rather, its truth depends on whether such a scenario is ruled out by available information.

This idea can be extended to different applications of modal logic. In epistemology, one can use an epistemic notion of accessibility where  for an individual  iff  does not know something which would rule out the hypothesis that . In application of modal logic to computer science, the so-called possible worlds can be understood as representing possible states and the accessibility relation can be understood as a program. Then  iff running the program can transition the computer from state  to state .

Different applications of modal logic can suggest different restrictions on admissible accessibility relations, which can in turn lead to different validities. The mathematical study of how validities are tied to conditions on accessibility relations is known as modal correspondence theory.

See also
 Modal logic
 Possible worlds
 Propositional attitude
 Modal depth

References

 Gerla, G.; Transformational semantics for first order logic, Logique et Analyse, No. 117–118, pp. 69–79, 1987.
 Fitelson, Brandon; Notes on "Accessibility" and Modality, 2003.
 Brown, Curtis; Propositional Modal Logic: A Few First Steps, 2002.
 Kripke, Saul; Naming and Necessity, Oxford, 1980.
 
 
 List of Logic Systems List of most of the more popular modal logics.

Modal logic
Binary relations